Segrik (also Romanized as Segrīk) is a village in Chaldoran-e Jonubi Rural District, in the Central District of Chaldoran County, West Azerbaijan Province, Iran. At the 2006 census, its population was 433, in 80 families.

References 

Populated places in Chaldoran County